Elapsoidea nigra, also known commonly as the black garter snake or Usambara garter snake, is a species of venomous snake in the family Elapidae. It is found in northeastern Tanzania and southeastern Kenya.

In 2009 the IUCN Red List of Threatened Species initially rated the species as endangered. In 2014, its status was updated to "least concern".

References

Elapsoidea
Snakes of Africa
Reptiles of Kenya
Reptiles of Tanzania
Reptiles described in 1888
Taxa named by Albert Günther